Nissar is an Indian film director in Malayalam movies. He has directed 21 Malayalam movies.

Filmography

Direction

References

External links

Malayalam film directors
Living people
Film directors from Thiruvananthapuram
20th-century Indian film directors
21st-century Indian film directors
Year of birth missing (living people)